Yoodoo Park, known by his stage name GRMLN, is a Japanese-American musician.

Early life and career
Park was born in Kyoto, Japan and raised in Southern California. Park started recording and producing music during his early years under the moniker GRMLN. Even though the project started off as an experiment for recording, Park's songs quickly picked up internet buzz, getting written up by many popular music blogs in the US and the UK, including DIY Magazine. (interview with Prefix Magazine) Park was signed to Carpark Records (Washington, D.C.) during his first year in college (at the age of 18) with the release of Park's first EP Explore. GRMLN's first album, Empire, was recorded at Different Fur Studios in San Francisco, California. Empire was released on June 4, 2013 via Carpark Records. GRMLN's second album, Soon Away, was released on September 16, 2014 also via Carpark Records. 

GRMLN has toured and supported popular acts in the indie/rock scene including Geographer, Yuck, Born Ruffians, and Tijuana Panthers. After signing to Carpark Records, Park has released Explore (2012), Empire (2013) and Soon Away  (2015) with the release of singles that were never released through vinyl ("Night Racer", "Void"). Park has since self-released Discovery, Out of Disorder, Afraid Of..., Explore II, Impressions From The Dark, Year of Isolation, Heavenly Bodies, Is It Really That Strange?, Non Classical, Goodbye, World, Morning Star, and Oni. Park has been cited as producer and mixer for all GRMLN albums released so far. Park's songs have been used in shows some including ABC's Revenge, Netflix's Shadowhunters, AMC+'s Pantheon, and Hulu's Difficult People.  The most notable appearance of his work was included in the major gaming franchise 'Forza Horizon 2' which used the song "Teenage Rhythm" from GRMLN's album Empire (2013).

Park has since then self-released a myriad of records slowly gaining his reputation as a prolific artist.

GRMLN is now based in America, Japan, and Australia.

Discography

Studio albums
 Explore (EP) October 2012 (Carpark Records)
 Empire (LP) June 4, 2013 (Carpark Records)
 Soon Away (LP) Sept 16, 2014 (Carpark Records)
 Discovery (LP) April 7, 2017 (Self-Released)
 Out of Disorder (LP) August 7, 2017 (Self-Released)
 Afraid Of... (LP)March 18, 2018 (Self-Released)
 Discovery//Afraid Of... (Double LP)May 11, 2018 (Self-Release)
 Explore II (LP)May 24, 2018 (Self-Released)
 Demos//B-Sides (LP)(Self-Released)
 Impressions From The Dark (LP) August 28, 2018 (Self-Released)
 Year Of Isolation (LP) October 29, 2018 (Self-Released)
 Heavenly Bodies (LP) January 17, 2019 (Self-Released)
Oni (LP) February 10th, 2019 (Self-Released)
 Is It Really That Strange? (LP) March 18, 2019 (Self-Released)
 Listening To Your Nightmares (EP) June 22, 2019 (Self-Released)
 Non Classical (LP) September 20, 2019 (Self-Released)
Goodbye, World (LP) March 1, 2020 (Self-Released)
Morning Star (LP) July 6, 2020 (Self-Released)
Dark Music In The Sun (LP) March 30, 2021 (Self-Released)
Laughing Shadow (LP) October 1, 2021 (Self-Released)
American Boy (LP) February 10, 2022 (Self-Released)
Lost Days In Lake Biwa (LP) June 17, 2022 (Self-Released)
Dark Moon (LP) January 4, 2023 (Spirit Goth Records)

Appearance in media
 "Teenage Rhythm" appeared in video game Forza Horizon 2.
 "Dear Fear" appeared on ABC's 'Revenge'.
 "27 Kids" appeared on Netflix's 'Shadowhunters'. and AMC's Animated Series 'Pantheon'
 "Superstar" also appeared on AMC's Animated TV Series 'Pantheon'.
 "Coral" and "Void" appeared on Hulu's 'Casual'.
 "Evil Baby" and "Don't You Wanna" appeared on CW's 'Republic of Sarah".

References

External links

American post-punk musicians
Japanese rock guitarists
Living people
Year of birth missing (living people)
Carpark Records artists
21st-century Japanese guitarists
Japanese emigrants to the United States
Musicians from Kyoto
American rock guitarists
21st-century American guitarists